David Zolkwer  is a producer and director of public events and ceremonies and corporate brand activation experiences.

Early Career 
Following an early career working in fringe theatre in London, Zolkwer has worked in the corporate and public events domain for experiential marketing agencies such as Imagination, Spectrum Communications, Caribiner International and Jack Morton Worldwide. He was Executive Vice President and Head of Public Events, International for Jack Morton Worldwide for 15 years. Since 2018 he has worked as an independent freelancer and co-director of Artisan Events.

Public Events, Ceremonies and Celebrations 
David Zolkwer has played a leading role in major public events, ceremonies and brand experiences across the world for over two decades.

1997 - 2000 

In 1997 he was both Project Director and Creative Director for the Hong Kong Handover Ceremony. He played the same dual role working on the 'Money' and 'Self Portrait' Zones at the Millennium Dome in 2000.

2000 - 2010 

In 2002 he was Project Director & Artistic Director for the ceremonies of the Manchester 2002 Commonwealth Games. He personally directed the Opening Ceremony which was attended by Her Majesty the Queen in her Golden Jubilee year. The success of the Manchester Commonwealth Games and the ceremonies were seen by many as a major statement of UK confidence and capability that paved the way for London's successful bid to host the 2012 Olympic Games.

In 2004 Zolkwer was Project Director and one of the lead Creative Directors for the ceremonies of the 2004 Olympic Games in Athens. He was the only non-Greek member of the core creative team led by Dimitris Papaioanou.

In 2005 Zolkwer directed the launch of the Melbourne 2006 Queen's Baton Relay from Buckingham Palace.

In 2006 he served as Executive Director supporting the team producing the ceremonies of the Melbourne 2006 Commonwealth Games.

Also in 2006 he directed 'Falklands 25', a commemorative event broadcast live from Horse Guards Parade, London and the Falkland Islands to mark the 25th anniversary of the end of the Falklands Conflict.

Over 2007/08 Zolkwer served as Creative Consultant and led a small team from Jack Morton Worldwide providing technical, production and operations consultancy to the Beijing Organizing Committee for the Olympic Games for the 2008 Summer Games in Beijing and Artistic Director Zhang Yimou who he also supported during the extended creative bid process for the Beijing Ceremonies (as did US movie director Steven Spielberg).

In 2008 Zolkwer was Project Director & Creative Director for the Team GB and Paralympic GB Team Homecoming – an event staged in Trafalgar Square, London, to celebrate the achievements of the British teams in Beijing.

In 2009 Zolkwer directed the launch of the Delhi 2010 Queen's Baton Relay from Buckingham Palace. Also in 2009, he was the Artistic Director for the Ceremonies of the 2009 FIFA Confederations Cup in South Africa.

Zolkwer was the Artistic Director of the Opening Ceremony of the 2010 FIFA World Cup in South Africa, described by the Guardian Newspaper as: "An unusually limber, oddly unstilted and bafflingly entertaining introduction to South Africa 2010".  A month later he also directed the ceremony that closed the tournament – an event featuring a surprise guest appearance by Nelson Mandela.

Also in July 2010, Zolkwer was the Artistic Director of 'Remembering Fromelles', a ceremony held exactly 94 years after the disastrous First World War battle of Fromelles in Northern France in which thousands of Australian and British troops lost their lives.  During the ceremony the last 250 British and Australian World War I troops recovered from recently discovered mass graves were reburied with full military honours.  The event was attended by the Prince of Wales, the Duke of Kent and the Governor-General of Australia, Dame Quentin Bryce AC.

Zolkwer was the Creative Director for the celebration sites in London's Hyde Park and Trafalgar Square created for the Royal Wedding, The marriage of H.R.H Prince William of Wales and Miss Catherine Middleton.  The event – themed around the idea that everyone was a guest at the Royal Wedding - welcomed the largest crowd ever assembled in Hyde Park.

From 2007 to 2015 Zolkwer was the creative director for the Mayor of London's annual New Year's Eve Celebrations - a lighting, projection and fireworks spectacular focused around the London Eye and the River Thames attended by a live audience numbering in excess of 350,000. The event was also broadcast live across the UK to audiences in excess of 12.5 million.

(Zolkwer's work on London's 2015 New Year's Eve spectacular saw the clock faces of Elizabeth Tower – home to Big Ben – lit blue to mark the involvement of UNICEF in the event.  This was the first time in the history of the tower that the clock faces had appeared in any colour other than white).

2010 - 2020 

In December 2012 Zolkwer returned to South Africa to join forces with local agency VWV to provide creative consultancy for the Opening & Closing Ceremonies of the 2013 Africa Cup of Nations.  

In July 2012 it was announced that Zolkwer had been appointed as Head of Ceremonies & Artistic Director for the Ceremonies of the Glasgow 2014 Commonwealth Games. He was also the Creative Director of the launch of the Glasgow 2014 Queen's Baton which was broadcast live from the Mall and Buckingham Palace in October 2013.

The Glasgow Commonwealth Games and their ceremonies were hailed as a huge success. The Opening Ceremony, attended by Her Majesty The Queen, featured performances by Karen Dunbar, John Barrowman, Amy Macdonald, Susan Boyle, Nicola Benedetti, Julie Fowlis, Pumeza Matshikiza, Billy Connolly, Rod Stewart and James McAvoy, as well as a pre-recorded video messages from the crew of the International Space Station and Ewan McGregor, Nicole Scherzinger and Sachin Tendulkar.

One innovative highlight of the Opening Ceremony 'activated' the partnership between Glasgow 2014 and UNICEF. A live international appeal on the night saw the team raise over $11m for the UNICEF Children of the Commonwealth fund.

In interviews recorded after the Games, Zolkwer attributed much of the success of  the Glasgow ceremonies to the warm collaborative partnership  established with Dr Bridget McConnell, CEO of Glasgow Life, and David Grevemberg who was the CEO of Glasgow 2014, as well as the Glasgow City Council leadership and the executive leadership of the Commonwealth Games Federation. 

Zolkwer served as Creative and Production Consultant to the Georgian Chamber of Culture for the Opening Ceremony of the Tbilisi 2015 European Youth Olympic Festival.

In December 2015 Zolkwer was appointed Project Director and Artistic Director of the Ceremonies of the Gold Coast 2018 Commonwealth Games - the fourth Commonwealth Games for which Zolkwer has delivered the ceremonies. His work on the Gold Coast Ceremonies saw him connect with, commission and curate over 40 local and national cultural and creative companies and organisations including respected 'national treasures' such as The Queensland Symphony Orchestra (Brisbane), Queensland Ballet (Brisbane), Bangarra Dance Theatre (Sydney), Dance North (Townsville) and the Yugambeh Museum. The following day the headline on the front page of the Gold Coast Bulletin declared "Now that's an opening! The Commonwealth Games opening ceremony at Carrara Stadium last night was as fair dinky Australian as it gets.  In an opening welcome reminiscent of Crocodile Dundee, the celebration was a bottler, ridgy-dodge - a little ripper...as millions of people watching worldwide fell in love with Australia".

The Courier-Mail said, "The Gold Coast finally welcomed the world to its biggest ever party with a dazzling Commonwealth Games opening ceremony".The New Daily said the opening ceremony had "wowed" the fans on the Gold Coast.The West Australiansaid that the "Spirits gone high" in the Gold Coast after the opening ceremony. The SBS called the ceremony as "dazzling" and the ABC said that the opening ceremony had "signalled a great start for the 2018 Commonwealth Games".

Reaction was overwhelmingly positive. The BBC said the 2018 Commonwealth Games started with a "colourful" and "spectacular" opening ceremony. The London Evening Standard said the Games began with a "spectacular opening ceremony paying tribute to region's Aboriginal history."The Daily Telegraph reported "Gold Coast Commonwealth Games began with every symbol of Australiana".

The Firstpost said, "Opening ceremony of Commonwealth Games 2018 celebrates indigenous culture, beaches and diversity".The Times of India commented, "What a spectacular welcome Gold Coast has given to the participating teams!".The Hindu said "...the opening ceremony of the XXI Commonwealth Games on Wednesday night was painted with colour and gaiety....". They also commented "The pageant showcased the Australian tradition and culture in all its glory".  The Courier Mail declared the Ceremony as a celebration of "the Gold Coast's coming of age".

(The launch of the Gold Coast 2018 Queen's Baton Relay from Buckingham Palace in 2017 was also the fourth such launch event for which Zolkwer had been responsible after Melbourne 2006, Delhi 2010 and Glasgow 2014).

In 2019 Zolkwer worked as a Production and Creative Consultant to the 'Moment Makers' team at Expo 2020. He was also commissioned as Executive Producer and Creative Director for the Opening Ceremony of the Doha 2019 Arabian Gulf Cup and the inauguration of the new Education City Stadium during the FIFA Club World Cup.

2020 - Current 

In 2021 Zolkwer was the project director for COP26, The United Nations Climate Change Conference, in Glasgow UK – the largest event of its kind ever hosted by the UK Government.

He directed Her Majesty The Queen's Platinum Jubilee Pageant which was witnessed live by over 200,000 people lining the streets of London on 5 June 2022, and broadcast to hundreds of millions of television viewers around the world. The spectacular show concluded with an historic (last) appearance by the Queen, accompanied by Prince Charles and Prince William on the Balcony of Buckingham Palace.

Also in 2022, he was Project Director for Delivery, Noor Riyadh - the largest citywide light art festival in the world. 

He ended the year working as Creative Consultant on the Mayor of London's New Year's Eve Celebrations. London Fireworks 2023

In December 2022 Zolkwer was appointed Project Director for the Coronation of His Majesty King Charles III.

Corporate Highlights (Selected) 

Zolkwer has worked on many major corporate brand events across the world and for clients across most sectors, including, in 2019, Emirates National Oil Company, (https://www.expo2020dubai.com/en/understanding-expo/participants/partner-pavilions/enoc) Expo 2020.

In 2006 Zolkwer led the team responsible for the creation of an event for 10,000 IBM employees in Bangalore, India. The event, attended by the President of India, was broadcast live by satellite to five other Indian cities.

Zolkwer also spearheaded the launch of telecommunications giant, Zain, first in the Middle-East in 2007 (simultaneous, satellite-linked events in Sudan, Bahrain, Kuwait and Jordan) and then, in 2008, across Africa (simultaneous, satellite-linked events in Burkina Faso, Chad, D.R.C., Gabon, Kenya, Madagascar, Malawi, Niger, Nigeria, Republic of Congo, Sierra Leone, Tanzania, Uganda and Zambia).

Education 
David Zolkwer attended the Guildhall School of Music and Drama. He then studied theatre and English at Middlesex University, where he earned a first class honours degree.

Honours and Awards 
Zolkwer was awarded an honorary doctorate from London's Middlesex University "in recognition of his outstanding contribution to his profession and his community".

He was appointed Member of the Royal Victorian Order (MVO) in the 2023 New Year Honours for services to the Platinum Jubilee Pageant.

References

1964 births
Living people
Theatre people from Greater Manchester
Members of the Royal Victorian Order